The Slovakia national under-21 football team, controlled by the Slovak Football Association, is Slovakia's national under-21 football team and is considered to be a feeder team for the Slovakia national football team.

European Under-21 Championship record
 1978 to 1994 - see Czechoslovakia

Key:
GP: Games played, W: Wins, D: Draws, L: Losses, GF: Goals for, GA: Goals against

UEFA European Under-21 Championship

2023 UEFA European Under-21 Championship qualification

2023 UEFA European Under-21 Championship play-offs 

The four play-off winners qualify for the final tournament.

All times are CEST (UTC+2), as listed by UEFA (local times, if different, are in parentheses).

|}

Results and fixtures

2021

2022

Players

Current squad
 The following players were called up for the 2023 UEFA European Under-21 Championship play-offs.
 Match dates: 23 and 27 September 2022
 Opposition: 
 Caps and goals correct as of:''' 7 June 2022, after the match against

Recent call-ups
The following players have also been called up to the Slovakia U21 squad in the past 12 months and remain eligible to play for the U21 team.

 INJ Withdrew/Unavailable due to an injury or an illness.
 ALT Alternate – replaces a member of the squad in case of injury/unavailability

Past squads
2000 UEFA European Under-21 Football Championship squad
2017 UEFA European Under-21 Football Championship squad

Managerial history

Other youth record
 2002 UEFA European Under-19 Football Championship – Third place
 2003 FIFA World Youth Championship – Round of 16

See also
 Slovakia national football team
 Czechoslovakia national under-21 football team
 Slovakia national under-20 football team
 Slovakia national under-19 football team
 Slovakia national under-18 football team
 Slovakia national under-17 football team
 Slovakia national under-16 football team
 Slovakia national under-15 football team

Notes

References

External links
 Slovak Football Association 
 The Rec.Sport.Soccer Statistics Foundation Contains full record of U-21/U-23 Championships.

European national under-21 association football teams
under-21